Lesben- und Schwulenverband in Deutschland (LSVD), German for the Lesbian and Gay Federation in Germany, is the largest non-governmental LGBT rights organisation in Germany. It was founded in 1990 and is part of the International Lesbian, Gay, Bisexual, Trans and Intersex Association (ILGA).

The organisation became known throughout Germany for its campaign for same-sex marriage in 1992. The LSVD was founded in Berlin, but is currently based in Cologne.

LSVD was formed as the Schwulenverband in der DDR (SVD) in 1990 and campaigned successfully to equal rights for a same-sex partnership.

Manfred Bruns, Volker Beck, Eduard Stapel, Günter Dworek and Halina Bendkowski were prominent persons in the Board of Directors. People from the arts like Comic-Designer Ralf König, comedian Hella von Sinnen, director Rosa von Praunheim, from politics and from science like sexologist Rolf Gindorf and others are prominent individual members of the organisation.

See also

LGBT rights in Germany
List of LGBT rights organisations
Hirschfeld Eddy Foundation, a Human Rights Foundation for Lesbians and Gays, erected by LSVD

References

External links

LSVD
Memorial site for the persecuted homosexual victims of National Socialism

LGBT political advocacy groups in Germany
Organisations based in Cologne